Touching the Art is a comedic web series created by comedian and artist Casey Jane Ellison and Emmy-winning writer/producer Shaw Bowman and produced by Ellison, Bowman and arts advocate Bettina Korek for Ovation. The series is formatted as a talk show, hosted by Ellison, and features an all-female panel of industry experts discussing issues in the contemporary art world. The show has featured respected artists, curators, critics and other art world insiders, including Catherine Opie, Jori Finkel, A. L. Steiner, Andrea Bowers, Mary Weatherford, Jennifer Rubell, Kembra Pfahler, Marilyn Minter, Clarissa Dalrymple, Anicka Yi, Juliana Huxtable, Christine Y. Kim, Liz Glynn, Lauren Cornell, and K8 Hardy.

The first season, filmed at Los Angeles art galleries Regen Projects and Night Gallery, premiered in July 2014. The second season, filmed at the New Museum in New York, premiered in February 2015 and was included in the 2015 New Museum Triennial. Ovation also produced five special episodes on location at Art Basel in Miami Beach in December 2014.

Season 1

Season 1.5 (Miami)

Season 2

References

External links
 Touching the Art on YouTube

American comedy web series